EZTABLE is an online restaurant reservation platform operating in Asia. Founded in Taipei, Taiwan, in April 2008, its mission is to create the world's largest dining program. Similar to OpenTable in the U.S., EZTABLE allows its users to search, reserve, and prepay online. Since its founding, EZTABLE has expanded to over 10,000 restaurants in Taiwan, Hong Kong, Thailand and Indonesia.

History
EZTABLE was co-founded by Alex Chen, Brooky Yen, Jerry Yen, and Peter Hsieh in April 2008. OpenTable, the online restaurant reservation company in the U.S., inspired the four. They found that consumers in Asia still made reservations via telephone, and decided to start their own online restaurant reservation business in Taiwan.

In August 2008, the website began operations serving a limited selection of restaurants. EZTABLE focused on O2O (Online-to-Offline) strategies, aiming to attract users online and direct them to physical stores in the offline realm. EZTABLE opened its first brick-and-mortar store in Taipei’s Nankang Software Park in March 2016. In the store, customers can make reservations, learn about the company’s two apps, and scan QR codes for EZTABLE gift cards.

In 2012, AppWorks, a famous accelerator in Asia, and Rose Park Advisors, an investment firm founded by Harvard Business School professor Clayton M. Christensen and his son Matthew Christensen, invested US$1.5 million in EZTABLE.

In January 2015, the company disclosed that it had raised a US$5 million funding round led by MediaTek, with participation from UMC, food conglomerate I-Mei, AppWorks and Rose Park Advisors.

In 2016, Japanese hotel and restaurant reservation company Ikyu invested US$8.8 million in EZTABLE, and the companies hope to promote tourism between their two countries.

Services
EZTABLE allows users to search for restaurants based on time, date, location and cuisine. To book a table through EZTABLE’s user-friendly platform, customers complete a two-part process consisting of reservation and prepayment for the meal. Reserving and prepaying through EZTABLE ensures that customers enjoy a business class experience at their restaurant of choice. Users can book restaurants online through the company’s website and on its two applications available for iOS and Android. The service also provides restaurant owners with  e-commerce services, including reservation management, table management, and marketing analysis.

Reception

See also
 List of companies of Taiwan
 List of websites about food and drink

References

External links 
 
 

2008 establishments in Taiwan
Food and drink companies established in 1998
Computer reservation systems
Online food ordering
Food and drink companies of Taiwan